Dubai TV is a TV channel offered by the Dubai Media Incorporated (DMI). It replaced Emirates Dubai Television on June 14, 2004. Dubai TV broadcasts programmes predominantly in Arabic. The programming caters to family Arab audience specifically in the Arab World and is available in Australia, Europe, North America and the rest of Asia. A majority of its programming is produced locally in Dubai Media City. Dubai TV is a part of a four channel network owned by DMI. High-definition "HD" format is free and available on Nilesat and Yahsat.

Programming 
News and current affairs (Developed by Dubai News Center)' Madārāt (Danger)
 Al Akhbar Al Emarat (Emirates News)- A Late night Flagship Newscast currently aired on Dubai TV, Sama Dubai TV and Noor Dubai TV.
 Qabil Lailnaqash (Debate)
 Kharitat Al Maal (Economic Update)
 Dubai Hadza Al Sabah (Dubai This Morning)- Morning Program
 The Insider- A Showbiz News Program that gives news and happenings in local and international artist.
 Al-Akhbar (The News)- is a two editioned newscast that gives news and information around the world in Arabic. These newscast has two editions- Midday (Mixed Local and International News) and Evening (International News).

 Soap operas 
 The Golden Girls Reality & Game Shows 
 Arabic version of Mental Samurai Arabic version of Family Feud Arabic version of Fashion Star Carpool Karaoke
 Dubai Cruise Chopped (Arabic version)
 Arabic version of The Insider Fashion Star Arabia The Doctors (Arabic version)
 Carpool Karaoke

 Former programming 
 Animated shows 
 Crocadoo Freej (2006-2013)
 Kim Possible (2004-2005)
 Poochini Sagwa, the Chinese Siamese Cat (2004-2005)

 Reality & Game Shows 
 Arabic version of Mental Samurai (2020)
 Arabic version of Millionaire Hot Seat (2013)
 Arabic version of The Cube'' (2014)

References

External links

Television stations in Dubai
Arabic-language television stations
Publicly funded broadcasters
State media